The Price of Existence is the second album by American deathcore band All Shall Perish, released in 2006. This is their first album to feature vocalist Eddie Hermida and lead guitarist Chris Storey. It has sold approximately 20,000 records worldwide. The bonus tracks on the Korean release are actually two tracks from the band's previous album Hate, Malice, Revenge.

Song information
The title of track 4 is a quote from prominent environmentalist David Brower. The song's theme also matches Brower's opinion on how the Earth is dying and his concern about mankind disregarding mother nature.

Track 7 is an instrumental song, its title, "Greyson" is the name of rhythm guitarist Ben Orum's then-newborn son.

Track listing

Personnel
All Shall Perish
Hernan "Eddie" Hermida – vocals
Chris Storey – lead guitar
Ben Orum – rhythm guitar
Mike Tiner – bass guitar
Matt Kuykendall – drums
Production
Engineered by Zack Ohren at Castle Ultimate Studios, Oakland, California

References

2006 albums
All Shall Perish albums